The Girl's vault event final for the 2014 Summer Youth Olympics took place on the 23rd of August at the Nanjing Olympic Sports Center Gymnasium.

Medalists

Qualification

The top eight gymnasts from qualification advanced into the final.

Results

Tiebreaker 
Ellie Downie and Sae Miyakawa had tied for second place with 14.566. For the tiebreaker, the highest scoring vault for each gymnast was used to determine who won the silver and who won the bronze. Downie's highest vault score was 14.866, and Miyakawa's was 14.800.

Reserves
The following gymnasts were reserves for the vault final.

References

Gymnastics at the 2014 Summer Youth Olympics